Leandro Benítez (born 5 April 1981) is a retired Argentine footballer who usually played as a midfielder on the left side of the pitch.

Career

A native of Ensenada, Benítez grew in the youth system of Estudiantes de La Plata, and in 2001 was loaned to Quilmes where he played two years, and then to Olimpo where he stayed another two years.

Back in Estudiantes since 2005, Benítez was part of the 2006 Apertura championship team. In 2008, he was runner up with the team in the Copa Sudamericana. Subsequently, he was a starter and key contributor on the team that won the 2009 Copa Libertadores. The midfielder played in 14 games, and scored 1 goal (against Nacional in the semifinal) during the tournament.

In the 2009 FIFA Club World Cup, Benítez scored twice in the semi-final against Pohang Steelers in a 2–1 win.

Coaching career
After retiring, Benítez became the manager of  Estudiantes's reserve team. On 14 June 2017, Benítez was appointed as caretaker manager of Estudiantes until the end of the season following the departure of Nelson Vivas. On 20 September 2017, he was once again appointed as the caretaker manager of the club, this time following the departure of Gustavo Matosas. He was in charge for one game, before a new manager was appointed nine days later. On 7 May 2018, he was again appointed as caretaker manager for the rest of the season after Lucas Bernardi resigned.

At the end of the season, he was appointed as the permanent manager of the club. On 24 February 2019, Benítez decided to resign after a period with poor results.

Honours
Estudiantes
Argentine Primera División (2): 2006 Apertura, 2010 Apertura
Copa Libertadores (1): 2009

References

External links
 Argentine Primera statistics at Fútbol XXI  
 
 

1981 births
Living people
Sportspeople from Buenos Aires Province
Argentine footballers
Association football midfielders
Estudiantes de La Plata footballers
Quilmes Atlético Club footballers
Olimpo footballers
Curicó Unido footballers
Boca Unidos footballers
Primera B de Chile players
Argentine Primera División players
Expatriate footballers in Chile
Estudiantes de La Plata managers
Argentine football managers